Rashmi Shetty is a Mangalore-born celebrity dermatologist, an aesthetic medicine expert and an author. She is a member of the international advisory board of the Anti-Ageing World Congress.

Early life 
Rashmi Shetty is a Mangalore-born celebrity dermatologist, an aesthetic medicine expert, globally invited teacher and an author.

An alumnus of the prestigious Mysore University, Shetty also holds a Post Graduate specialization in Dermatology from the College of Physicians and Surgeons, Mumbai. She has a Fellowship in Cosmetology from Chester, UK. Shetty completed advanced training in Injectables Aesthetic Solution in her early years from various thought leaders in Europe and Singapore. She also trained under Niwat, Kasemrad Hospital, Bangkok for Advanced Laser skills.

Career 
Shetty is an international speaker, teacher and author with over 18 years of experience in aesthetic and clinical dermatology. Shetty is the Founder and chief dermatologist at Ra Skin and Aesthetics in Mumbai and Hyderabad.

Shetty's entrepreneurial spirit led her to found Solskin – her own beauty supplement company. Ra Supplements, the first line of beauty supplements in India created and formulated by a dermatologist, are said to holistically bloom one's internal well-being to promote healthy skin. 

In 2012, Shetty studied business from Indian School of Business, with full scholarship from Goldman Sachs, and went on to win the best business plan award at her graduation.

Awards and achievements 

 Shetty has multiple papers in peer reviewed Indian and International journals. One such paper, published in the PRS Journal, was awarded the Best South East Asian Paper by the American Plastic Surgery Association.
 Shetty is frequently invited as a faculty at several dermatology and plastic surgery society meetings including the American Association of Dermatology( AAD), Australian Association of Dermatology, Thai Derm Society & IADVL, ASDS and International Congress of Dermatology among others.
 Shetty is also an international trainer for facial injectables like Botox, fillers, energy based devices and cosmeceuticals with industry leaders like Allergan, Merz and Galderma. She has trained doctors across the world.
 She has been an integral part of the advisory board of many skin and hair care MNCs globally namely, Unilever for Pond's, Vaseline and Lakme, Procter & Gamble for Gillette, Clinique for Estée Lauder, Marico for Parachute's haircare range, & Bio-Oil.
 Shetty has many awards to her credit from industry and popular forums. The most recent and the most popular one is the title of "Best Dermatologist" from Vogue in 2020.
 The first Indian doctor on the International Advisory board of the Anti-Ageing World Congress, FACE London, ICAD Asia etc., Shetty has now been associated with them for over eight years and counting, representing our country with enormous pride.
 Member of Consensus Board driving safe standards of injectables in Facial aesthetics for Allergan India and International.
 Skin Care Advisor for Femina Miss India and Actor Prepares, a film school by Bollywood Actor.

Publications 
 Shetty is the author of Age Erase, a bestselling book on skin care for all ages published by Random Book House.
 Shetty's paper on Consensus Recommendations for Treatment Strategies in Indians Using Botulinum Toxin and Hyaluronic Acid Fillers was awarded the " Best Southeast Asian paper" by PRS in September 2018.
 Shetty has authored the chapter, "Fillers for lips" in IADVL Handbook of Aesthetic Procedures in Dermatology.
She has also co-authored the chapter, Peri-Orbicular Rejuvenation, Ophthalmic Surgical Techniques in a textbook authored by Professor Ivo Pitanguy.
Her article 'Under Eye Infra Orbital Injection Technique: The Best Value in Facial Rejuvenation' written for the Journal of Cosmetic Dermatology 13 has received a worldwide acclaim.
In July 2015, her article Inner Circle v/s Outer Circle on a strategy to use volumizers in an Indian face was published in the Journal of Aesthetic Cosmetic Surgery.
Her opinion on the debate Cannulas vs Needles was published in December/January 2015 edition of PMFA news, a British journal.
She has also published Peri-Orbital Rejuvenation of the Ageing Face: Understanding the Non-Surgical Treatments in the Journal of College of Ophthalmology of Sri Lanka in 2006.
Other articles published by Shetty include Skin Lightening and Brightening Ingredients – An Overview in July 2013 in Ingredients South Asia; and Consensus on Current Injectable Treatment Strategies in the February 2016 edition of the Asian Face.
She has articles regularly published in The Times of India, Vogue, Elle, Harpers Bazaar, Reader's Digest, The Hindu, The Indian Express, online journals, health websites etc.

References 

Year of birth missing (living people)
Living people
Indian dermatologists
Indian women medical doctors
Medical doctors from Karnataka
Women scientists from Karnataka
Scientists from Mangalore